Robert F. Kennedy's Law Day Address was delivered on May 6, 1961 (Law Day) to the students of the University of Georgia School of Law in Athens, Georgia. It was his first official speech as United States Attorney General outside the capital, and the first endorsement of the civil rights movement by the Kennedy administration.  Kennedy used most of the address to talk about civil rights and how he planned to enforce them. He placed a heavy emphasis on the rule of law and the example the United States would be setting for the international community in the face of communism. Kennedy had spent a substantial amount of time preparing for the speech, which ultimately distracted him from the Freedom Rides that would test his resolve to ensure civil rights in its immediate aftermath.

Background 
Robert F. Kennedy had been preparing for his first speech as Attorney General outside of Washington D.C. for five weeks, which itself went through seven different drafts with a "Southern Brain Trust" of advisers and particular assistance from Assistant Attorney General Burke Marshall and John Seigenthaler. Over time the work transitioned from a statement on organized crime to one about civil rights. Kennedy wanted to make it apparent that he aimed to change the political climate in America.

The situation at the University of Georgia was tense, as the school had only been integrated in January and had been subject to violent protests. The Bay of Pigs Invasion had only occurred less than a month before Law Day, and the Freedom Riders had just entered the South the day before. Vandals had painted "Yankee go home" on a sidewalk, but this was washed away before the speech.

Before Kennedy arrived on May 6, a group of protesters gathered outside the lecture hall. Police arrested five fundamentalist ministers with signs saying "The Bible teaches separation." Georgia Governor and university alumnus Ernest Vandiver, a critic of the Kennedy administration's attitude towards segregation, was noticeably absent from the event, instead choosing to go to the Kentucky Derby. Among those in attendance were Athens Mayor Ralph Snow, State Senator Julian Cox, and Charlayne Hunter, one of the students who was involved in the integration of the school.

Attorney General Kennedy, with his hands trembling, gave his speech at 11:00 AM before about 1,600 students.

Summary 
Kennedy opened by thanking Georgia's citizens for giving his brother, President John F. Kennedy, the largest percentage of the popular vote out of all the states during the 1960 election. He shortly thereafter brought up his brother's proclamation of Law Day:

Kennedy listed three areas in which the Justice Department was involved that required immediate attention. The first, Kennedy argued, was organized crime:

The second area was price fixing:

He then warned about how this negatively affected the argument for capitalism in the Cold War:

Kennedy spent the most time talking about the third area; civil rights. Kennedy first pointed out how the international community was looking for sides to choose in the Cold War. He stressed that by leading by example in respecting civil rights in an orderly manner, the United States would attract populations of developing countries away from communism. He then shifted to matters in Virginia, where the schools in Prince Edward County had been shut down in the face of forced integration. Kennedy defended the controversial actions of the federal government on the matter:

Kennedy shared his belief that the Supreme Court's Brown v. Board of Education ruling against segregated schools was just. He conceded that this wasn't pertinent; the courts had made their decision, and that was the law. This expressed Kennedy's philosophy at the time that the law held supremacy over cultural issues and local concerns and that it was the foundation of enforcing civil rights. Kennedy promised that as attorney general he would enforce civil rights statutes and other federal legislation. He attempted to invoke a universal sense of responsibility and commitment with a quote by the Georgian Henry W. Grady:

Kennedy finished:

Kennedy then returned to his seat. After a brief pause, the audience broke into applause for around half a minute.

Aftermath 
The address marked the first official endorsement of civil rights by the Kennedy administration. Robert Kennedy's statements were idealistic and somewhat naive; he believed that he could scare the South into compliance under the threat of enforcing the law. He had made a promise to defend civil rights, which was almost immediately tested as the Freedom Riders were caught up in violence while challenging segregation in the South. Being focused on his speech preparations and the fallout from the Bay of Pigs Invasion distracted his attention away from the Freedom Rides as they began. Three days following the speech, White House Press Secretary Pierre Salinger stated that President John F. Kennedy would be backing away from some of the civil rights planks that he had supported in the election.

On May 10, 1961 Representative John Brademas of Indiana praised Kennedy's speech before Congress.

See also 
Report to the American People on Civil Rights

References

References

External links 
 Full transcribed text and audio of the speech
 Original text of the speech

Speeches by Robert F. Kennedy
1961 in American politics
1961 speeches
May 1961 events in the United States
University of Georgia